Bidvest Bank, (BVBL), is a business bank in the Republic of South Africa. It is licensed as a "locally-controlled bank" by the Reserve Bank of South Africa, the national banking regulator.  It is a niche bank specialising in foreign exchange and providing retail banking, vehicle financing and insurance.

History
In 1998, the Bidvest Group acquired Rennies Foreign Exchange, as part of the acquisition of the Rennies Group.

In 2000, following the issuance of a banking license by the South African Reserve Bank, Rennies Foreign Exchange became Rennies Bank.

In 2007 Rennies Bank rebranded into Bidvest Bank. The bank maintains over 140 retail banking outlets across South Africa. It is still heavily involved in meeting the banking needs of traveling businesspeople and tourists, but has a variety of retail banking products on its menu.

Overview
The bank is a 100% subsidiary of its parent company, Bidvest Group Limited (BVGL), a South African-based International business conglomerate.

See also

 List of banks in South Africa
 South African Reserve Bank
 Economy of South Africa

References

External links
 Website of Bidvest Bank Limited
 Website of Reserve Bank of South Africa

Banks of South Africa
Banks established in 2000
Companies based in Johannesburg
Bidvest companies